Jacob Jeremiah Sullivan (born November 28, 1976) is an American political advisor who currently serves as the United States national security advisor to President Joe Biden. He was previously director of policy to President Barack Obama, national security advisor to then Vice President Biden and deputy chief of staff to Secretary Hillary Clinton at the U.S. Department of State. Sullivan also served as senior advisor to the U.S. federal government at the Iran nuclear negotiations and senior policy advisor to Clinton's 2016 presidential campaign, as well as visiting professor at Yale Law School. 

On November 23, 2020, President-elect Biden announced that Sullivan would be appointed as national security advisor. He took office January 20, 2021.

Early life and education
Sullivan was born in Burlington, Vermont to a family of Irish descent and grew up in Minneapolis, Minnesota. His father worked for the Star Tribune and was a professor at the University of Minnesota School of Journalism and Mass Communication, and his mother was a high school guidance counselor. Sullivan attended Southwest High School in Minneapolis, where he graduated in 1994. He was a Coca-Cola Scholar, debate champion, president of the student council, and voted "most likely to succeed" in his class.

Sullivan attended Yale University, where he majored in international studies and political science and was awarded the Alpheus Henry Snow Prize. He was inducted into Phi Beta Kappa his senior year and graduated summa cum laude with distinction in 1998 with a bachelor of arts. Sullivan won a Rhodes Scholarship to attend Magdalen College, Oxford, where he studied international relations. He was awarded a Marshall Scholarship the same year but turned it down in favor of the Rhodes. While at Oxford, Sullivan served as a managing editor of the Oxford International Review. He graduated with a master of philosophy. He graduated with a juris doctor from Yale Law School in 2003.

At Yale, he was an editor of the Yale Law Journal and the Yale Daily News. He was a member of the Yale Debate Association and earned a Truman Scholarship in his junior year. He also worked for Brookings Institution president Strobe Talbott at the Yale Center for the Study of Globalization.

Career

Early career 
After graduating from law school, Sullivan clerked for Judge Guido Calabresi of the United States Court of Appeals for the Second Circuit and then for Justice Stephen Breyer of the United States Supreme Court. After his clerkships, Sullivan returned to his hometown of Minneapolis to practice law at Faegre & Benson and taught law as an adjunct professor at the University of St. Thomas School of Law. After Faegre & Benson, Sullivan worked as chief counsel to Senator Amy Klobuchar, who connected him to Hillary Clinton.

Obama administration 

In 2008, Sullivan was an advisor to Hillary Clinton during the primary cycle and then to Barack Obama during the general election campaign. He prepared Clinton and Obama for debates. When Clinton became secretary of state, Sullivan joined as her deputy chief of staff and director of policy planning, and he travelled with her to 112 countries.

Sullivan worked in the Obama administration as deputy assistant to the president and national security advisor to Vice President Joe Biden. He became Biden's top security aide in February 2013 after Clinton stepped down as secretary of state. In those posts, he played a role in shaping U.S. foreign policy towards Libya, Syria, and Myanmar.

On June 20, 2014, The New York Times reported that Sullivan was leaving the administration in August 2014 to teach at Yale Law School. , he was a nonresident senior fellow at the Carnegie Endowment for International Peace.

Iran nuclear negotiations

In November 2013, the Associated Press reported that officials in the Obama administration had been in secret contact with Iranian officials throughout 2013 about the feasibility of an agreement over the Iranian nuclear program. The report stated that American officials, including Deputy Secretary of State William J. Burns, Senior White House Iran Advisor Puneet Talwar, and Sullivan, had secretly met with their Iranian counterparts at least five times face to face in Oman. Those efforts paved the way for the Geneva interim agreement on the Iranian nuclear program, known officially as the Joint Plan of Action, signed by Iran and the P5+1 countries in Geneva, Switzerland, on November 24, 2013.

Since then, Sullivan has regularly attended bilateral consultations with Iran in Geneva as a member of the U.S. delegation on the Iran nuclear negotiations.

2016 Clinton presidential campaign
Sullivan was Hillary Clinton's chief foreign policy adviser during her 2016 bid for the presidency.

He was reported to be the only senior staffer who repeatedly suggested that Clinton should spend more time in Midwestern swing states in during the election campaign. Clinton's surprising failure to win those states was a key factor in her defeat. Sullivan was prominent in many of the Podesta emails released by WikiLeaks during the 2016 US presidential election, including Sullivan questioning if Democratic primary candidate Martin O'Malley's 100% clean energy by 2050 plan was "realistic". After the election, he confessed to feeling "a keen sense of responsibility" for Clinton's defeat. On March 24, 2022, former President Donald Trump sued numerous people including Hillary Clinton and Jake Sullivan alleging a conspiracy by the Hillary Clinton campaign to invent the Russian collusion scandal. The suit was dismissed on September 8, 2022, and on January 19, 2023, a federal judge imposed nearly $1 million in sanctions on Trump and his lawyer Alina Habba, calling the suit “completely frivolous.”

Macro Advisory Partners and Microsoft 
After his work with the Clinton campaign, Sullivan joined Macro Advisory Partners, a risk advisory company, in January 2017; it paid him at least $135,000. While at the London-based advisory firm, he advised a number of companies including Uber. Following the Clinton campaign, he joined the Carsey School of Public Policy at the University of New Hampshire as a member of the faculty and senior fellow.

Between 2017 and May 2020, Sullivan served on an advisory council for Microsoft; in 2020, he was paid $45,000 for this work. Given his role in crafting U.S. cyber security policy in the Biden administration, including overseeing the government's response to January's cyberattack on Microsoft, concerns have been raised about potential conflicts of interest.

Biden administration

On November 22, 2020, Sullivan was announced as President-elect Joe Biden's choice to be National Security Advisor. Upon his appointment, Sullivan stated that the early priorities of Biden's National Security Council (NSC) are the COVID-19 pandemic, "restructuring the NSC to make public health a permanent national security priority", and China relations. He also emphasized that the Biden administration aimed to repair American relations with allies that he regarded as being damaged during the Trump administration.

One of Sullivan's themes in the job is connecting US actions on the world stage to the lives and welfare of ordinary Americans, with the mantra of "a foreign policy for the middle class".

After the fall of Kabul to the Taliban, Sullivan said that the collapse of the government of Afghanistan occurred because at the "end of the day, despite the fact we spent 20 years and tens of billions of dollars to give the best equipment, the best training and the best capacity to the Afghan national security forces, we could not give them the will and they ultimately decided that they would not fight for Kabul and they would not fight for the country." However, Brett Bruen, director of global engagement in the Obama White House called for his dismissal over his role in the affair.

On September 28, 2021, Sullivan met in Saudi Arabia with Saudi Crown Prince Mohammed bin Salman to discuss the 2021 global energy crisis and Saudi Arabian-led intervention in Yemen. They also discussed the potential deal to normalize relations between Israel and Saudi Arabia.

On October 6, 2021, a high level meeting between Sullivan and top Chinese diplomat, CCP Politburo member Yang Jiechi in Zürich, Switzerland focused on a number of contentious aspects of Chinese-American relations, including the existence of Taiwan, trade disputes, the COVID-19 origin theories, as well as civic freedoms in Hong Kong. Despite continued differences between the two nations on these issues, both sides agreed to continue their cooperation "in the spirit of fair and peaceful competition".

On October 25, 2021, Sullivan was briefed by Pentagon officials on the full range of military options to ensure that Islamic Republic of Iran would not be able to produce a nuclear weapon.

On November 7, 2021, Sullivan stated that the US does not pursue system change in China anymore, marking a clear break from the China policy pursued by previous US administrations. Sullivan said that U.S. is not seeking a new Cold War with China, but is looking for a system of peaceful coexistence.

On December 7, 2021, Sullivan warned that Russia's Nord Stream 2 natural gas pipeline project will end in the event of Russian invasion of Ukraine.

On January 14, 2022, Sullivan accused Russia of sending saboteurs into Ukraine to stage "a false-flag operation" that would create a pretext for Russia to invade Ukraine. Russian Foreign Minister Sergey Lavrov dismissed the U.S. claim as "total disinformation."

On February 11, 2022, Sullivan publicly warned about the likelihood of a Russian invasion of Ukraine prior to the end the 2022 Winter Olympics, urging all Americans to leave Ukraine immediately and indicating that there may be "no prospect of a U.S. military evacuation" once the invasion commences. He claimed that "Russia has all the forces it needs to conduct a major military action." Ukrainian President Volodymyr Zelensky said that warnings of an imminent Russian invasion are "causing panic and not helping" and asked for firm proof that Russia plans to invade Ukraine.

On March 13, 2022, Sullivan warned of a full-fledged NATO response if Russia attacks any part of NATO territory.

On March 14, 2022, he warned China that it would face consequences if it helped Russia evade sanctions.

Personal life
Sullivan is married to Margaret Goodlander, who was a former advisor to senators Joe Lieberman and John McCain and law clerk to then Chief Judge Merrick Garland and Justice Stephen Breyer.

See also 
 List of law clerks of the Supreme Court of the United States (Seat 2)

References

External links

 
 
 

1976 births
21st-century American diplomats
21st-century American lawyers
Alumni of Magdalen College, Oxford
American Rhodes Scholars
Directors of Policy Planning
Hillary Clinton 2016 presidential campaign
Law clerks of the Supreme Court of the United States
Lawyers from Minneapolis
Living people
Minnesota Democrats
Minnesota lawyers
Obama administration personnel
People associated with the 2008 United States presidential election
Place of birth missing (living people)
University of St. Thomas (Minnesota) faculty
Vermont Democrats
Washington, D.C., Democrats
Yale Law School alumni
Yale Law School faculty
United States National Security Advisors